A referendum on the proposed constitution of the Federated States of Micronesia was held on 12 July 1978. It was approved in Chuuk, Kosrae, Pohnpei and Yap, who formed the Federation on 10 May the following year. In the Marshall Islands and Palau it was rejected, resulting in the islands becoming separate states.

Results

References

Trust Territory
Constitutional
Constitutional
Constitutional
Referendums in Palau
Referendums in the Marshall Islands
Referendums in the Federated States of Micronesia
Constitutional referendums
Trust Territory